Solomon Haumono (born 13 October 1975) is a former professional boxer and former rugby league footballer of Tongan descent.

Early life
He attended Newtown Boys High School, Newtown, New South Wales. He then went on to Christian Brothers' High School, Lewisham and represented them in the New South Wales Combined Catholic Colleges Australian Schoolboys team 1993.

Rugby league career
He played in the NRL for the Manly-Warringah Sea Eagles, the Canterbury-Bankstown Bulldogs, the Balmain Tigers, the St George Illawarra Dragons, and in the Super League for the London Broncos/Harlequins RL. Haumono played at representative level for New South Wales and Australia, although these three state matches and one international match were in 1997, when Super League contracted players were ineligible for State of Origin selection. He also captained Tonga.

Haumono made his first grade debut for Manly-Warringah in round 11 1994 against Balmain, coming off the bench in a 42–0 victory at Leichhardt Oval.  In 1995, Haumono featured heavily in the Manly side which won the minor premiership having lost only 2 matches all year.  Haumono played from the bench in Manly's shock grand final loss to Canterbury.  In 1996, Haumono played 14 games but missed out on selection in Manly's premiership winning side which defeated St. George in the grand final.

In 1997, Haumono signed with Canterbury who aligned themselves with the rival Super League competition during the Super League war.  During the 1998 NRL season, Haumono walked out on Canterbury midway through the year after devising a plan to get out of his contract with the club.  Haumono's plan was to join his supposed girlfriend Gabrielle Richens in England.  Haumono elaborated on the plan saying ''I was under contract for the Bulldogs so it was decided to come up with a plan that would ultimately force the Bulldogs to rip up my contract, So the plan was formed that I was going to chase after my girlfriend at the time in England. So off I went and before I knew it, the paper got a hold of it and blew it up, making headline news and myself being chased by the media at home and even there in London".

The plan was devised by Haumono and close friend Anthony Mundine but fell over when Canterbury got wind of the plot and instead fined Haumono and put him in reserve grade.

In 1999, Haumono signed with Balmain. Haumono only made 8 appearances for Balmain due to an elbow injury.  In 2000, Haumono joined St George but only featured in 2 games, the last of which was the club's humiliating 70–10 loss against Melbourne at the Melbourne Cricket Ground.

Return to League
Following a second spell with Manly in 2003, Haumono joined the London Broncos and played in the capital for two seasons. In December 2006, with a year remaining on his contract, Haumono quit rugby league to return to professional boxing.

Boxing career

2000 to 2002
Haumono first took time out of rugby league after his spell with the St George Illawarra Dragons in 2000. He followed in the footsteps of his father (Australian former heavyweight champion Maile Haumono) to take up a career in professional boxing. He fought eight times between 2000 and 2002, winning all of his heavyweight contests inside the distance. Solomon briefly held the title of New South Wales heavyweight champion before rejecting an offer to join the stable of American promoter Don King and returning to rugby league.

Return to boxing – post 2008 
Haumono resumed his boxing career with a first-round knockout on 7 March 2007. He began training under trainer Johnny Lewis who has assisted Haumono in reaching his 14–0 (all by K.O.) record in the heavyweight ranks. He fought Cliff Couser on 27 August 2008 and won the fight by unanimous decision.  He fought Colin Wilson on 11 March 2009 with the fight going to a draw after ten rounds. Solomon won his next fight by disqualification on 16 May 2009 against Royce Sio (1w-0l-0d).  Haumono was floored in the eleventh second of the first round by a right hook from Sio, but Sio then leaned down and hit Haumono again while Haumono's back was on the ground, leading to an instant disqualification.  Haumono was back on his feet a few seconds later.

Haumono fought Justin Whitehead on 16 August 2009 and lost for the first time in his career by split decision. He defeated Michael Kirby by tenth-round TKO for the OPBF Heavyweight Title on 18 September 2009, and became the Australian Heavyweight Champion after a tenth-round TKO of Franklin Egobi in Melbourne on 7 September 2012.

On 31 December 2012, he fought k1 legend Kyotaro Fuijmoto under boxing rules defeating him in the fifth round via TKO.

On 28 April 2013, he lost by TKO to Kevin Johnson.

On 21 July 2016, he lost by TKO to Joseph Parker.

Professional boxing record

Personal life
Haumono is married to Margaret, who is a cousin of his friend and fellow rugby league player-turned boxer Anthony Mundine. Solomon and Margaret have five children.

He dated English model Gabrielle Richens for a period of time during his time with Canterbury.

In 2015, Haumono revealed he had been suffering a drug addiction during his league career. He was addicted to ice, cocaine and ecstasy.

References

External links
 Solomon Haumono's Official Website

|-

|-

|-

|-

1975 births
Living people
Australia national rugby league team players
Australian male boxers
Australian sportspeople of Tongan descent
Australian rugby league players
Balmain Tigers players
Boxers from Auckland
Canterbury-Bankstown Bulldogs players
Heavyweight boxers
London Broncos players
Manly Warringah Sea Eagles players
New South Wales City Origin rugby league team players
New South Wales rugby league team players
Rugby league players from Auckland
Rugby league props
Rugby league second-rows
St. George Illawarra Dragons players
Tonga national rugby league team captains
Tonga national rugby league team players
Tongan male boxers
Tongan sportspeople